This is a filmography of films and videos that portray the life and culture of the Ainu people of what is now northern Japan and the fringe of the Russian Far East. Representations of the Ainu can vary from the strictly documentary to the fictional and, as with representations of Native Americans in Hollywood cinema, may suffer from distortions and stereotypes.

The list is divided between documentaries and fiction films.

Documentaries
A Record of the Shiraoi Ainu (1925)
The Ainu Bear Ceremony (1931)
Uepotara—A Traditional Exorcism Rite of the Nibutani Ainu (1933)
Chisenomi (1934)
 (Riken Kagaku, 1941)
Kotan no hitotachi (1959), NHK documentary
Words: The Symbol of a People (1993), directed by Shiro Kayano
Kyōsei e no michi: Nihon no senjū minzoku Ainu (1993)
The Despised Ainu People (October 1994)
Shin kyōsei e no michi: Nihon no senjū minzoku Ainu (2000)
TOKYO Ainu (2010)
Kamui to ikiru (2011), directed by Hideki Komatsu
Ainu. Pathways to Memory (2013), directed by Marcos Centeno

Fiction films
 (Shochiku, 1947), directed by Kenkichi Hara
 (Toho, 1949), directed by Senkichi Taniguchi
 (Daiei Film, 1950), directed by Kazuo Mori
 (Shochiku, 1953–54), directed by Hideo Ōba
 (Toho, 1957), directed by Mikio Naruse
 (Nikkatsu, 1960), directed by Buichi Saitō
 (Daiei Film, 1961), directed by Kunio Watanabe
 (1993), directed by Haruki Kadokawa
 (2004), directed by Isao Yukisada
 Ainu Mosir (2020)

References

Ainu
Ainu culture